James Madison (August 27, 1749 – March 6, 1812) was the first bishop of the Diocese of Virginia of The Episcopal Church in the United States, one of the first bishops to be consecrated to the new church after the American Revolution. He also served as the eighth president of the College of William and Mary. In 1780, Madison was elected to the American Philosophical Society.

Youth, education 
Born in Port Republic, in Augusta County (now Rockingham County), near Staunton, Virginia, he was the son of John and Agatha (née Strother) Madison. He was educated at home and at a private school in Maryland, before attending the College of William and Mary in Williamsburg, Virginia where he graduated with high honors in 1771. On July 29, 1772, he received the gold medal given as a prize for classical learning by the Royal Governor of Virginia, Norborne Berkeley, 4th Baron Botetourt, who is better known in Virginia as "Lord Botetourt".

He read law with George Wythe, and was admitted to the bar, though he did not practice law.

Dual career: educator and theologian 
Madison taught philosophy and mathematics at the college from 1773 to 1775, when he went to England to be ordained a priest of the Church of England. He returned to the Colony of Virginia, and was serving as an instructor at William and Mary as the hostilities which led to the American Revolutionary War broke out.

He was a cousin of James Madison, Jr. (1751–1836), who was a member of the Virginia General Assembly, U.S. Representative in the first four sessions of the United States Congress, and the fourth President of the United States. Both Madisons were heavily involved in the issues of freedom of religion and the separation of church and state.

In 1777, Madison served as chaplain of the Virginia House of Delegates and organized his students into a militia company. The same year, Loyalist sympathies of the college's president, the Reverend John Camm (who had been the initial litigant in the Parson's Cause case 1758–1764), brought about Madison's removal from the faculty. But later, Madison became the eighth president of the College of William and Mary in October 1777, the first after separation from England.

As the college's president, Madison worked with the new leaders of Virginia, most notably Thomas Jefferson, on a reorganization and changes for the college which included the abolition of the Divinity School and the Indian School, which was also known as the Brafferton School. The 1693 royal charter provided that Indian School of the college educate American Indian youth. The college's founder, Reverend Dr. James Blair had arranged financing for that purpose using dedicated income from England which was interrupted by the Revolutionary War. By 1779, the Brafferton School had permanently closed, although "The Brafferton", as it is known in modern times, remains a landmark building dating to the Colonial Period on the campus. Along with establishment of new, firmer financial footing, the creation of the graduate schools in law and medicine officially made the "College" a school meeting the contemporary definition of a "university" by 1779, notwithstanding the retention of the word College in the original name (as set forth in the 1693 Royal Charter).

The Reverend Dr. Madison also presided over the first convention of the newly formed Diocese of Virginia of the Episcopal Church in the United States of America in 1785 and was consecrated as a bishop on September 19, 1790, in Lambeth Palace, London, England. Despite the concerns of some patriots, the Right Reverend Dr. Madison, or Bishop James Madison, as he came to be known, successfully served both the College of William and Mary and the Diocese of Virginia separately during the important transitional period.

Madison sought to step down from his duties as bishop in 1805; whether an assistant bishop was chosen, as he appears to have wished, is somewhat unclear. He remained as President of the College of William and Mary for 35 years, serving until his death, although quite infirm in his last years and unable to attend the General Convention. Bishop Madison died in Williamsburg on March 6, 1812, about a year after he ordained future bishop William Meade as a deacon. Bishop Madison is interred in the chapel of the college in Williamsburg.

Heritage 
Although he is not generally regarded as one of the Founding Fathers of the United States, his role in successfully helping restructure and lead both the College of William and Mary and the Church of England in the United States during and after the American Revolution was a major contribution to the new country. In modern times, the Bishop James Madison Society, a secret society which was founded in 1812 immediately after his death, is named for him.  Also named in his honor is a residence hall at William and Mary.

Consecrators 
 The Most Reverend John Moore, 88th Archbishop of Canterbury
 The Right Reverend Beilby Porteus, Bishop of London
 The Right Reverend John Thomas, Bishop of Rochester
James Madison was the 4th bishop consecrated for the Episcopal Church.

See also 
 College of William and Mary
 History of Virginia
 List of bishops of the Episcopal Church in the United States of America

References 

Bishop James Madison: A Biographical Sketch of Bishop James Madison by Emma L. Powers

External links 

 College of William and Mary
 Episcopal Diocese of Virginia

1749 births
1812 deaths
18th-century Anglican bishops in the United States
British North American Anglicans
College of William & Mary alumni
Madison family
People from Augusta County, Virginia
Presidents of the College of William & Mary
Burials at the College of William & Mary
Episcopal bishops of Virginia